In the mathematical fields of algebraic geometry and arithmetic geometry, the Consani–Scholten quintic is an algebraic hypersurface (the set of solutions to a single polynomial equation in multiple variables) studied in 2001 by Caterina Consani and Jasper Scholten. It has been used as a test case for the Langlands program.

Definition
Consani and Scholten define their hypersurface from the (projectivized) set of solutions to the equation

in four complex variables, where

In this form the resulting hypersurface is singular: it has 120 double points. Its Hodge diamond is

The Consani–Scholton quintic itself is the non-singular hypersurface obtained by blowing up these singularities. As a non-singular quintic threefold, it is a Calabi–Yau manifold.

Modularity
This was known for "rigid" Calabi–Yau threefolds, for which the family of Galois representations has dimension two, by the proof of Serre's modularity conjecture. The Consani–Scholton quintic provides a non-rigid example, where the dimension is four.

References

3-folds